The women's 100 metres was an event at the 1992 Summer Olympics in Barcelona, Spain. There were a total of 55 participating athletes, with seven qualifying heats. The top four in each heat qualified for the quarterfinals along with the four fastest remaining.

The world record holder and defending gold medalist Florence Griffith-Joyner had retired. The returning silver medalist, 35 year old Evelyn Ashford ran fast in the quarterfinals but was eliminated in the semis. Other returning veterans included Merlene Ottey, who won her first Olympic medal in 1980, Anelia Nuneva who made a heroic attempt to keep up with Griffith-Joyner four years earlier, only to have her hamstring explode in the attempt. Through the semi-final round, Juliet Cuthbert had the fastest qualifying time, while Gwen Torrence was the winner of the other semi-final. Both Cuthbert and Torrence were also returning finalists from 1988. Irina Privalova, Mary Onyali and Liliana Allen were younger sprinters. As the world championship silver medalist in the 100 metres hurdles, Gail Devers was known as a hurdler and didn't carry a strong reputation as a sprinter, though she had finished a distant second in Griffith-Joyner's world record race.

From the gun in the final, Privalova leaped out to an early lead in lane 6. Less noticed in lane 2, Devers also got a slight edge on the two Jamaicans and Torrence in the middle of the track. But Privalova couldn't put them away, instead all three were slowly gaining on the early leaders, with Cuthbert gaining a slight edge amongst the three. By the finish, Devers, Cuthbert, Privalova and Torrence all were within a foot of one another, with Ottey only another foot back. Separated by inches, Devers beat Cuthbert to the line.  Privalova barely arrived ahead of Torrence who passed her in the next step after the line.

Four years later, it would be Devers again by inches ahead of Ottey and Torrence to become only the second woman to win the 100 twice in a row.

Records
These were the standing world and Olympic records (in seconds) prior to the 1992 Summer Olympics.

Results

Heats
First 4 from each heat (Q) and the next 4 fastest (q) qualified for the semifinals.

Quarterfinals

Quarterfinal 1

Quarterfinal 2

Quarterfinal 3

Quarterfinal 4

Semifinals

Semifinal 1
Wind: -2.9

Semifinal 2
Wind: -0.8

Final
Wind: -1.0

See also
 1990 Women's European Championships 100 metres (Split)
 1991 Women's World Championships 100 metres (Tokyo)
 1993 Women's World Championships 100 metres (Stuttgart)
 1994 Women's European Championships 100 metres (Helsinki)

References

External links
 Official Report
 Results

 
100 metres at the Olympics
1992 in women's athletics
Women's events at the 1992 Summer Olympics